The German Speaking Evangelical Congregation in Iran (Evangelische Gemeinde Deutscher Sprache in Iran) is a church in Tehran, Iran, that was founded by expatriates in 1957. It is affiliated with the Evangelical Church in Germany.

The congregation acquired a plot of land and built Christ Church in Teheran (Christuskirche Teheran) in 1961. The church is a brick structure without a tower, seating up to 120 people. The building is located at Shahid Sheydayi Street 123/1 in the Gholhak area of northern Tehran, a center of German-speaking residents up to the 1979 revolution, near the then-German School and other community institutions.

Protestant Christians founded it in Germany, Switzerland, and Austria in Iran. Since the Iranian revolution, this has been the only expatriate Protestant church in Tehran. It also serves English speakers. Services are conducted in German on Fridays, and there is an English language service on the first Friday of the month.

See also
List of religious centers in Tehran
German Embassy School Tehran

References

External links
 Evangelische Gemeinde Deutscher Sprache im Iran

Austrian diaspora
Protestantism in Iran
Churches in Tehran
Evangelical Church in Germany
German diaspora in Asia
Swiss diaspora
Germany–Iran relations